"Take Me Back" is a song by Australian rock-pop band Noiseworks, which was written by their lead vocalist Jon Stevens and sometime collaborator Brent Thomas. It was released in 1987 as the second single from their first studio album Noiseworks (1987), which was produced by Mark Opitz. The single peaked at number seven on the Australian Kent Music Report singles chart.

Track listing
7" (650775 7)

12" (650775 6)

Charts

Weekly charts

Year-end charts

References

External links
 "Take Me Back" at Discogs

Noiseworks songs
1987 songs
1987 singles
CBS Records singles
Songs written by Jon Stevens
Song recordings produced by Mark Opitz